Kindelbrück is a municipality in the district of Sömmerda, in Thuringia, Germany. It is situated on the river Wipper, 12 km north of Sömmerda. The former municipalities Bilzingsleben, Frömmstedt and Kannawurf were merged into Kindelbrück in January 2019. In January 2023 Kindelbrück absorbed the former municipality Riethgen.

Inhabitants

References

Sömmerda (district)